Salem City Schools is a school division serving students living in Salem, Virginia.

Administration

Superintendent 
The current superintendent of Salem City Schools is Dr. H. Alan Seibert.

School Board 

 David Preston (Chair)
 Dr. Michael Chiglinsky (Vice Chair)
 Nancy Bradley
 Artice Ledbetter
 Andy Raines
 Kathy Jordan (Clerk of the Board and Executive Secretary)

Schools 
Salem City has 6 schools; 4 elementary schools, 1 middle school , and 1 high school.

Elementary schools 

 East Salem Elementary School
 George Washington Carver Elementary School
 South Salem Elementary School
 West Salem Elementary School

Secondary schools

Middle school 

 Andrew Lewis Middle School

High school 

 Salem High School

References 

School divisions in Virginia